Rayilukku Neramachu is a 1988 Indian Tamil-language film directed by Bharathi Mohan, starring Ramarajan and Nishanthi. It was released on 27 May 1988.

Plot 
Manikkam attends a wedding in his village with his relatives and tries to help a woman in need. Problems arise when that woman informs in front of everyone that she is his wife.

Cast 
Ramarajan as Manikkam
Nishanthi as Chellakili
Pandiyan
Madhuri as Kuyili
S. S. Chandran
V. K. Ramasamy
Vinu Chakravarthy
Manorama
Gandhimathi
Chinni Jayanth
Thyagu
Kumarimuthu
Oru Viral Krishna Rao
C. R. Saraswathi

Soundtrack 
The music was composed by S. A. Rajkumar who also wrote the lyrics.

Reception 
Jeyamanmadhan of Kalki called it a routine rural story.

References

External links 
 

1980 films
1980s Tamil-language films
1988 films
Films scored by S. A. Rajkumar